The history of Westchester County, a county in the state of New York, can be traced back to the founding of a settlement between the Hudson River and Long Island Sound in the 17th century. The area now known as Westchester County had seen human occupation since at least the Archaic period, but significant growth in the settlements that are now incorporated into the county did not occur until the Industrial Revolution.

Prehistory
At the time of European contact in the 16th and 17th centuries, the Native American inhabitants of present Westchester County were part of the Algonquian peoples, whose name for themselves was Lenape, meaning the people. They called the region Lenapehoking, which consisted of the area around and between the Delaware and Hudson Rivers. Two related languages, collectively known as the Delaware languages, were spoken throughout the region: Unami and Munsee. They were part of the larger Algonquian language family and related to Mahican. Munsee was spoken by the inhabitants of present-day Westchester County as well as on Manhattan Island. Some ethnographers, lacking valid contemporary sources, simply referred to the various tribes of the area as Munsee speakers, or, even more generally, as Lenni Lenape.

Title deeds given to European settlers supply considerable information on the sub-tribes in the region and their locations. The Manhattans occupied the island known by that name today, as well as the part of southern Westchester now covered by Yonkers. The Wecquaesgeek band of the Wappinger lived along the Hudson River and near the modern settlements of Dobbs Ferry, Tarrytown and White Plains. The Siwanoy lived along the coast of the Long Island Sound near present-day Pelham, New Rochelle, Larchmont, Mamaroneck and Rye. The northern portions of the county were occupied by smaller bands of Wappinger such as the Tankiteke, Kitchawank and Sintsink.

Colonial era

The first European explorers to visit the Westchester area were Giovanni da Verrazzano in 1524 and Henry Hudson in 1609. European settlers were initially sponsored by the Dutch West India Company in the 1620s and 1630s, while English settlers arrived from New England in the 1640s. By 1664, the Dutch lost control of the area to the English and large tracts of Westchester were established as manors (held by a single owner) or patents (held by partners). The manor and patent owners leased land to tenant farmers and provided them with many essential services.

Westchester County was one of the original twelve counties of the Province of New York, created by an act of the New York General Assembly in 1683. At the time it also included present day Bronx County, which included the original Town of Westchester and portions of Yonkers, Eastchester, and Pelham.

During the colonial period, life in Westchester was quite primitive. Roads were few and in poor condition, and transportation was heavily dependent on water. Nearly everything settlers consumed was raised or made on their farms. Wood, cattle and food were bartered for the items the settlers couldn't grow or make themselves. Over time cottage industries, such as shoe and furniture making, sprang up. This led to heavier use of local roads, which encouraged improvements, which in turn spurred increased travel. Taverns catering to travelers were established and ferries were launched. By 1775, Westchester was the richest and most populous county in the colony of New York.

American Revolutionary War 
The county experienced a variety of effects, caused by the American Revolutionary War, as families were often divided between Patriot and Loyalist sympathies. After the battles of Pell's Point and White Plains in 1776, the primary American headquarters was located at Continental Village, north of Peekskill, while the British were headquartered in New York City. The region between Morrisania and the Croton River, which was called "neutral ground" was pillaged by both sides. Two loyalist factions, Skinner's Greens and De Lancey's Cowboys, engaged in guerrilla warfare, cattle theft, and looting. Warfare, settling scores against neighbors, and rape caused many residents to abandon their homes and flee the area. The novel The Spy is set in the Neutral Ground.

The Philipsburg Manor House played an important role: British General Sir Henry Clinton used the manor house during the war. There in 1779 he wrote the Philipsburg Proclamation, which declared all Patriot-owned slaves to be free, and that blacks taken prisoner while serving in Patriot forces would be sold into slavery.

Although the Revolutionary War devastated the county, recovery after the war was rapid. The large landowners in Westchester were mostly Loyalists, and after the war their lands were confiscated by the state and sold. Many local farmers were able to buy the lands they had previously farmed as tenants. In 1788, five years after the end of the war, the county was divided into 20 towns. In 1798, the first federal census recorded a population of 24,000 for the county.

19th century
In 1800, the first commercial toll road, the Westchester Turnpike, which ran through Pelham and New Rochelle, was chartered. Other toll roads, including the Croton (Somerstown) Turnpike, were later established. During this same period, steamboats began to be used on the Hudson River. The expansion of transportation options encouraged economic growth. Larger industries were established, such as iron foundries in Peekskill and Port Chester, brickyards in Verplank and Croton, and marble quarries in Ossining and Tuckahoe.

Two developments in the first half of the 19th century – the construction of the first Croton Dam and Aqueduct, and the coming of the railroad – had enormous impact on the growth of both Westchester and New York City. The Croton Dam and Aqueduct was begun in 1837 and completed in 1842. The aqueduct carried water  from Croton to two reservoirs in Manhattan to be distributed to the city.  Now a National Historic Landmark, the Croton Aqueduct is considered one of the great engineering achievements of the 19th century.

In the 1840s, the first railroads were built in Westchester. In 1844, the New York and Harlem Railroad reached White Plains. The Hudson River Railroad was completed to Peekskill in 1849, as was the New York and New Haven Railroad's route through eastern Westchester. The railroads often determined whether a town grew or declined, and they contributed to a population shift from Northern to Southern Westchester. By 1860, the total county population was 99,000, with the largest city being Yonkers. Many small downtowns, centered on railroad stations, flourished.

The period following the American Civil War enabled entrepreneurs in the New York area to create fortunes, and many built large estates in Westchester. Several mansions of this era are preserved and open to the public, including: Lyndhurst in Tarrytown, Kykuit in Pocantico Hills, the Jay Heritage Center in Rye, Caramoor in Katonah and Glenview in Yonkers.

Expansion of the New York City water supply system also impacted local development, as new dams, bridges and roads were built. The flooding of thousands of acres for reservoirs created considerable dislocations in many towns north of White Plains. The building of the New Croton Dam and its reservoir, for instance, resulted in the relocation of the hamlet of Katonah to higher ground. In North Salem, the hamlet of Purdys was moved when five percent of the town was inundated.

During the latter half of the 19th century, Westchester's transportation system and labor force attracted a manufacturing base, particularly along the Hudson River and Nepperhan Creek. Pills and patent medicines were manufactured in Ossining; greenhouses in Irvington; beer in Dobbs Ferry; sugar, paving materials and conduit in Hastings; and in Yonkers, elevators and carpets.

In 1874, the western portion of the present Bronx County, consisting of the towns of Kingsbridge, West Farms, and Morrisania, was transferred to the City & County of New York; and in 1895 the remainder of present-day Bronx County, consisting of the Town of Westchester (centered on the present-day Westchester Square) and portions of the towns of Eastchester and Pelham, was also transferred to the City & County of New York. Prior to that, a portion of the town of Eastchester had seceded, to become the city of Mount Vernon. In 1898, these annexed portions were formed into the Borough of the Bronx.  In January 1914, The Bronx was split off from New York County and Bronx County was created, thus making the Borough of Manhattan & the County of New York coterminous with each other.

20th century
During the 20th century, the rural character of Westchester would transform into the suburban county known today. Between the county's railroad network and the proliferation of the automobile in the early 20th century, working in New York City and living in the country became possible for the middle class. In 1907 the Bronx River Commission,  a joint venture between New York City and Westchester County, was established to improve the river's water quality. The commission's efforts led to the creation of the Bronx River Parkway Reservation, completed in 1925, and the first modern, multi-lane limited-access roadway in North America. The success of the parkway encouraged the County government to develop its parks system, preserving great tracts of open space.

Playland in Rye, a National Historic Landmark, opened to the public in 1928, the first planned amusement park in the country, and is operated by Westchester County to this day. The development of Westchester's parks and parkway systems supported existing communities and encouraged the establishment of new ones, transforming the development pattern for Westchester. Homes were constructed on former estates and farms. New businesses appeared in response to expanded markets; White Plains, with branches of many New York City stores, became the county's central shopping district. With the need for homes expanding after World War II, multistory apartment houses appeared in the urbanized areas of the county, while the market for single-family houses continued to expand. By 1950, the total County population was 625,816.

Major interstate highways were constructed in Westchester during the 1950s and 1960s. The establishment of these roadways, along with the construction of the Tappan Zee Bridge, encouraged many major corporations, such as PepsiCo, General Foods, Ciba-Geigy and IBM to establish headquarters in Westchester.

21st century

See also
 List of counties in New York
 National Register of Historic Places listings in Westchester County, New York
 USS Westchester County (LST-1167)
 Downstate New York

Notes

References

Further reading

External links

 Westchester County Government
 
 Hudson Valley Directory, listings pertaining to Westchester County, New York
 Westchester County Historical Society

Westchester County, New York
Westchester